George David Woods (July 27, 1901 – August 20, 1982) was a U.S. banker. He served as President of the World Bank from January 1963 until March 1968.

Biography
George Woods was born in Boston, Massachusetts in 1901. After completing high school he was employed as an office boy at Harris, Forbes & Co., an underwriting firm. At the company's urging, he attended night school in banking, and later became a buyer in the underwriting department. By the age of 26 he had been promoted to a vice president position. In 1930 the firm was acquired by Chase Bank, and Woods was made vice president of the new firm; he later became vice president and member of the board of First Boston Corporation, a newly formed securities company.

First Boston became one of the largest investment banking firms in the United States, and Woods played a major role in it. In 1947 he became one of two executive vice presidents, then in 1948 became chairman of the executive committee. Then, in 1951 Woods became chairman of the board.

World Bank Service

Woods tenure at the World Bank accompanied its transformation into a more global institution, One emphasis he had was to work to correct the disparity between rich and poor, and North and South. Under Woods, there was an increasing focus on economic analysis in determining root causes for constrained growth in developing nations, and less focus on the basis determination of country creditworthiness.

Under his tenure, the International Centre for Settlement of Investment Disputes (ICSID) was established, which provided assurance for nervous private investors.

Woods was also leader of the World Bank during the effort to assist India, which resulted in the devaluation of the rupee in 1966.

Honour

Foreign honour
  : Honorary Grand Commander of the Order of Loyalty to the Crown of Malaysia (1973)

References

 Biography of George David Woods (website)

1901 births
1982 deaths
20th-century American businesspeople
American bankers
Presidents of the World Bank Group
Honorary Grand Commanders of the Order of Loyalty to the Crown of Malaysia